The rhythmic gymnastics events at the 2001 World Games in Akita was played between 22 and 23 August. 24 rhythmic gymnastics competitors, from 16 nations, participated in the tournament. The rhythmic gymnastics competition took place at Akita City Gymnasium.

Participating nations

Medal table

Events

References

External links
 Fédération Internationale de Gymnastique
 Gymnastics on IWGA website
 Results

 
2001 World Games
World Games
International gymnastics competitions hosted by Japan